Elisha Walker (October 8, 1879 – 1950) was an American businessman and writer. He was born in New York City. Isaac Walker was his father. He studied at Hotchkiss School, Yale and Massachusetts Institute of Technology.

He was an officer in a railroad. He was involved in a battle for control of Transamerica Corporation. He became a partner at Kuhn, Loeb & Co.

Writings
"A Design for a Shipyard" 1902, M. I. T. B.S. thesis
"Concerning iron making, with special reference to the Buffalo and Susquehanna Iron Company" 1903
"Industrial Mississippi, with Special Reference to the Gulf and Ship Island Railroad" 1904

References

External links

1879 births
1950 deaths
Businesspeople from New York City
People from Syosset, New York
Lehman Brothers people
20th-century American businesspeople
American businesspeople in the oil industry
Massachusetts Institute of Technology alumni
American bankers
American chief executives of financial services companies